Narragansett Pier is an unincorporated village and a census-designated place (CDP) in the town of Narragansett in Washington County, Rhode Island, United States. The population was 3,409 at the 2010 census.

Geography
Narragansett Pier is located at  (41.429928, -71.466410).

According to the United States Census Bureau, the CDP has a total area of 10.2 km2 (3.9 mi2). 9.4 km2 (3.6 mi2) of it is land and 0.8 km2 (0.3 mi2) of it (8.12%) is water.

Demographics

As of the census of 2000, there were 3,671 people, 1,745 households, and 886 families residing in the CDP. The population density was 391.5/km2 (1,013.5/mi2). There were 2,129 housing units at an average density of 227.1/km2 (587.8/mi2). The racial makeup of the CDP was 94.03% White, 0.87% African American, 1.69% Native American, 1.04% Asian, 0.79% from other races, and 1.58% from two or more races. Hispanic or Latino of any race were 1.88% of the population.

There were 1,745 households, out of which 15.5% had children under the age of 18 living with them, 40.3% were married couples living together, 8.0% had a female householder with no husband present, and 49.2% were non-families. 37.4% of all households were made up of individuals, and 17.1% had someone living alone who was 65 years of age or older. The average household size was 2.08 and the average family size was 2.70.

In the CDP, the population was spread out, with 13.3% under the age of 18, 13.3% from 18 to 24, 24.1% from 25 to 44, 27.2% from 45 to 64, and 22.1% who were 65 years of age or older. The median age was 44 years. For every 100 females, there were 86.3 males. For every 100 females age 18 and over, there were 84.5 males.

The median income for a household in the CDP was $39,918, and the median income for a family was $65,864. Males had a median income of $34,726 versus $29,792 for females. The per capita income for the CDP was $26,811. About 8.8% of families and 14.1% of the population were below the poverty line, including 17.0% of those under age 18 and 9.4% of those age 65 or over.

Notable people 
 Roberta Dunbar
 Varina Davis, former First Lady of the Confederacy, vacationed here as a widow in the 1890s.
 Varina Anne Davis, her youngest daughter, known as the "Daughter of the Confederacy", vacationed here with her mother. Died here on September 18, 1898, at the age of 34.

References

Census-designated places in Washington County, Rhode Island
Narragansett, Rhode Island
Narragansett Bay
Populated coastal places in Rhode Island
Providence metropolitan area
Villages in Washington County, Rhode Island
Census-designated places in Rhode Island
Villages in Rhode Island